His Wife's Diary is a 2000 Russian biographical film directed by Alexei Uchitel. It is a story about the last love affair of Ivan Bunin (played by Andrei Smirnov). It is set in French Riviera in the 1940s.

His Wife's Diary was awarded the Grand Prize of the Kinotavr Festival and the 2000 Nika Award for Best Film, Best Male Actor (Smirnov) and Best Cinematography (Klimenko). It was Russia's submission to the 73rd Academy Awards for the Academy Award for Best Foreign Language Film, but was not accepted as a nominee.

Plot
A tragic story of love and loneliness - this is the unknown life of the Russian writer Ivan Bunin. The love story that involved Bunin, his wife Vera, the young poet Galina Plotnikova, opera singer Marga Kovtun and literary man Leonid Gurov.

Cast
Andrei Smirnov as Ivan Bunin
Galina Tyunina as Vera Bunina
Olga Budina as Galina Plotnikova
Yevgeny Mironov as Leonid Gurov
Elena Morozova as Marga Kovtun
Dani Kogan as Zhanna
 Yuri Stepanov as a guest at the reception

See also
List of submissions to the 73rd Academy Awards for Best Foreign Language Film

References

External links

2000 films
2000 biographical drama films
Films set in the 1940s
2000s Russian-language films
Films directed by Alexei Uchitel
Russian biographical drama films
Films scored by Leonid Desyatnikov
Films set in France
2000 drama films